Callinicum may refer to the following places and jurisdictions :

 an Ancient city and former bishopric, now Raqqa in Syria.
 two Catholic titular bishoprics, both of episcopal rank, 'restoring' the above diocese :
 Latin Callinicum of the Romans
 Maronite (Eastern Catholic, Antiochian Rite) Callinicum of the Maronites.